St. Michael the Archangel's Church or the Garrison Church is a Roman Catholic church in the city of Kaunas, Lithuania, closing the perspective of the Laisvės alėja, the main pedestrian street. It was built between 1891 and 1895 when Kaunas was part of the Russian Empire, in Neo-Byzantine style largely for the use of the Russian Orthodox  garrison of Kaunas Fortress.

History

The construction of "military" or "garrison" Orthodox churches by the Russian government in former Polish–Lithuanian Commonwealth lands had started after the suppression of the November Uprising of 1830-31, and peaked during the reign of emperor Alexander III of Russia. Initially the site of this church had been intended to be used for a Catholic church, but these plans had been abandoned after the Uprising.  

The church was designed as an Orthodox cathedral of Saints Peter and Paul in 1890 by K. H. Lymarenko; it was authorized for construction on November 10 that year. Official groundbreaking was celebrated on 29 June 1891. The cathedral was completed in four years (unusually quickly for its size), and was inaugurated on 17 September 1895. Later Lymarenko's plan was modified by David Grimm from St. Petersburg. The church's decorative scheme was outlined by Griaznov and implemented by craftsman from Vilnius. Most of the construction was carried out by workers from Chernigov Governorate, and its art-work was implemented by craftsmen from St. Petersburg.

As usual for military churches of the period, the construction of Kaunas cathedral was financed equally by the Military Ministry and by donations from army servicemen. Completion of the church finalized the administrative building complex of the Kaunas Fortress; it symbolized less the presence of Orthodox Christians than the imperial authority of the Russian government. It was also believed that the church would reduce interdenominational frictions.

After the fall of the Kaunas Fortress during World War I the Germans cut down the church bells and transported them to Germany. The church stayed closed until 1919.

In the interwar period the cathedral became a Roman Catholic church of the Lithuanian garrison of Kaunas. There were voices urging the demolition of the church as it was labeled as without architectural value.

During the rule of the Soviet Union, it was used as an art gallery. Nowadays it serves as a Roman Catholic church. The other popular name of the church is Soboras.

Architecture

Kaunas cathedral stood out among similar military churches by its size (it was designed to fit 2,000 worshipers) and its unusual architecture -  employing triple Corinthian columns in an otherwise typical "neo-Byzantine" (Romanesque) five-dome design. In total the exterior has 266 large and small columns and pilasters. This eclectic spin-off of mainstream "Byzantine" architecture (the so-called Roman Byzantine style) was hailed by contemporary architectural journalists, but never gained popularity.

As built, the cathedral reached 50 meters height; it was finished in three shades of sandstone color with equal-armed cross ornament. For the interior the structure relied on four load-bearing pylons designed to appear slimmer and lighter than in reality. The space between external and internal shells of the main dome was filled with hollow clay resonators. Cut from granite, floor tesseras were bought from abroad. In the dome above the altar were images of two Archangels or evangelists. The main altar's stained glass showed God's entrance to heaven. Smaller domes housed bells; one of them had been founded in 1681. Just inside the church and to the right is the entrance to the catacombs, which are accessible to the public.

Gallery

Museum for the blind
The Kaunas Museum for the Blind is located underneath the church. It originated as a 2005 art installation - "21st century catacombs" – designed for the blind, the visually impaired, and the sighted. The project was overseen by the Lithuanian sculptor, Robertas Antinis, and architect, Linas Tuleikis.

See also
 Saint Michael: Roman Catholic traditions and views

References

Roman Catholic churches in Kaunas
Churches completed in 1895
19th-century Roman Catholic church buildings in Lithuania
Byzantine Revival architecture in Lithuania
Church buildings with domes
Military chapels of Lithuania